Geetanjali is a 1993 Hindi-language romance film, produced and directed by Shakti Samanta under the Shakti Films banner. It stars Jeetendra, Rekha  and music composed by Bappi Lahiri.

Plot
Geetanjali is the story of two twin sisters Geeta and Anjali (Rekha in the double role). Geeta is a music teacher and Anjali is a world-renowned famous dancer. Sagar (Jeetendra) is a college professor who has come to his sister's place to spend his holiday. There he meets Geeta, they fall in love and get married. In the course of time, they have a child. Geeta is of a very suspicious nature. Whenever Sagar comes late, she suspects that he must be having an affair with his female students. One of the students, Kaveri, flirts with Sagar, so that he will pass her in the exams. She tries to take advantage of Sagar, but when she is turned down, Kaveri reports to the principal that Sagar tried to rape her. Sagar is suspended till further inquiry and Geeta, who had always suspected Sagar, leaves the house and goes to stay with her sister. Anjali knew Sagar well and did not believe Geeta. Anjali goes to Sagar's house as Geeta to find out the truth. Will Sagar's innocence be proved?

Cast

Jeetendra as Professor Sagar Bhardwaj
Rekha as Geeta / Anjali (Double Role)
Dalip Tahil as P. D. 
Asrani as Ramprasad Durgaprasad Tiwari
Ajit Vachani as Makhnani
Vijay Arora as Sagar's Brother-in-Law
Anita Kanwal as Sagar's Elder Sister
Ram Mohan as Principal Ghosh
Dinesh Thakur as Vice-Principal Sharma
Achyut Potdar as Professor Iyer 
Sushmita Mukherjee as  Seeta 
Amita Nangia as Kaveri Saxena

Soundtrack

References

External links
 

Films directed by Shakti Samanta
Films scored by Bappi Lahiri
1993 films
1990s Hindi-language films